Chloe's Closet is a British animated children's series produced by MoonScoop Entertainment and Telegael Teoranta. The series is mainly aimed for children ages 2 to 7 years old.

The show premiered in the United States on PBS Kids Sprout on July 12, 2010, and later aired in the United Kingdom on CITV and Cartoonito.

Plot
The adventures of a young girl (Chloe) and her friends (Tara, Jet, Danny, Riley, Lillian, Mac and Carys) and her toys (Lovely Carrot, Wizz and Soggy) as they go on magical adventures while playing dress-up in her closet in her room.

Characters
Chloe Corbin is the main protagonist of the series. She is a young Welsh girl with a big imagination. She's created her own imaginary world that she and her friends regularly use when playing dress-up and having adventures in a closet in her room, and has designs on being a historian. Chloe has a kind heart and is always up for adventure. Her catchphrases are "Lollipops!", "Pickles!", "Anything is possible in my world.", "Not in my world.", "They are in my world." and "Anything can happen in my world.". She is voiced by Eleanor Webster.
Lovely Carrot is a plush toy and security blanket that Chloe owns, and is her imaginary friend. He's a small yellow blanket, with a toy duck head attached. In Chloe's imaginary world, Lovely Carrot comes to life. He's always trying to help Chloe out and look after her, but he can be a bit of a klutz. He is a brave, friendly and gentle gentleman. His catchphrases are "No worries!" and "Flying feathers!". He is voiced by Paul Tylak.
Tara Jansen is Chloe's best friend who is a red-headed Irish girl. Being half a year older than her friends, she considers herself to be older and wiser. Sometimes, Tara can be a bit bossy and usually tries to take charge on adventures. She never quite seems to get that's Chloe's job, though. She is voiced by Siobhán Ní Thuiraisg.
James "Jet" Horton is Chloe's British best friend who is male. He usually tries to turn play time towards more boyish games, but is always there to help her out. He has a crush on Danny. He is voiced by Oisín Kerans.
Daniela "Danny" Rylant is Chloe's Scottish tomboy friend. She prefers puddle jumping rather than playing with dolls and also loves preparing food. She's always up for an adventure, but can be a bit too competitive for her own good at times. She is voiced by Charly Ann Brookman in season 1 and Hana Evans in season 2.
Riley Harris is Chloe's friend who is a Black British boy. He is voiced by Derry McCafferey.
Lillian "Lil" McGwire is Chloe's friend who is Welsh. She loves more girly activities. She tends to criticize herself and sometimes needs to be convinced to give new things a try. She is voiced by Jasmine Belson.
Marcus "Mac" McGwire is Lillian's younger brother. He's still learning to talk, but usually manages to get the point across. Mac looks up to his sister and the two tend to get along fairly well. He is voiced by Daniel Keogh in season 1 and Lola Davies in season 2.
Carys Mozart is Chloe's friend who is a Welsh girl and she likes ponies. She only appeared in season 2, and is voiced by Anna Webster.
Hootie-Hoo is Chloe's toy owl.
Soggy is Chloe's toy frog.
Wizz is Chloe's mechanical toy dog.
Regina "Gina" Corbin and Paul Corbin are Chloe's parents who appear at the end of the episodes. They are voiced by Teresa Beausang and Paul Tylak.

Dan Russell, Jade Yourell and Emma Tate provide voices for additional guest characters in almost every episode.

Episodes

Season 1 (2009-2010)

Season 2 (2013–2014)
Production for the second season took place from January-November 2012. Episode 19 onwards have a 2013 copyright date in the credits (in some territories it still says 2012).

Development
Mike Young and her daughter Sarah Finn conceptualized the show in early 2005. Finn's eldest daughter (Chloe Cheshire, born January 2003, now a filmmaker), inspired the main protagonist of the series. Production for the first season was green-lit in mid-2007 and began in 2008.

Broadcast
The show premiered in Asia through Playhouse Disney as early as 2010. 

In 2011, the series was purchased by France 5, Tiji, and Playhouse Disney in France, PBS Kids Sprout in the United States, Cartoonito in Italy, Channel One in Russia, KiKA in Germany, CITV in the United Kingdom, Disney Channel and Playhouse Disney in Spain, TVP1 (season 1)/MiniMini+ (season 2) in Poland and CBeebies in Latin America. Within that time, Turner Broadcasting System Europe acquired the British cable rights to the series for it to air on their Cartoonito channel for broadcast in the Summer of 2011.

The series also aired on TVOKids in Canada, TVNZ in New Zealand, Sat.1 in Germany, Hop! Channel in Israel, and Yle TV2 in Finland.

References

External links
Official Site (archive)

2000s American animated television series
2010s American animated television series
2009 American television series debuts
2013 American television series endings
2000s British animated television series
2010s British animated television series
2009 British television series debuts
2013 British television series endings
American children's animated adventure television series
American children's animated comedy television series
American children's animated fantasy television series
American flash animated television series
American preschool education television series
British children's animated adventure television series
British children's animated comedy television series
British children's animated fantasy television series
British flash animated television series
British preschool education television series
Animated preschool education television series
2000s preschool education television series
2010s preschool education television series
English-language television shows
Television series by Splash Entertainment
Animated television series about children
Animated television series about ducks